In classical mechanics and kinematics, Galileo's law of odd numbers states that the distance covered by a falling object in successive equal time intervals is linearly proportional to the odd numbers. That is, if a body falling from rest covers one unit of distance in the first arbitrary time interval, it covers 3, 5, 7, etc. units of distance in subsequent time intervals of the same length. This mathematical model is accurate if the body is not subject to any forces besides uniform gravity (for example, it is falling in a vacuum in a uniform gravitational field). This law was established by Galileo Galilei who was the first to make quantitative studies of free fall.

Explanation

Using a speed-time graph

The graph in the figure is a plot of speed versus time. Distance covered is the area under the line. Each time interval is coloured differently. The distance covered in the second and subsequent intervals is the area of its trapezium, which can be subdivided into triangles as shown. As each triangle has the same base and height, they have the same area as the triangle in the first interval. It can be observed that every interval has two more triangles than the previous one. Since the first interval has one triangle, this leads to the odd numbers.

Using the sum of first n odd numbers

From the equation for uniform linear acceleration, the distance covered 

The middle figure in the diagram is a visual proof that the sum of the first  odd numbers is  In equations:

{|
|1                 || = 1  || = 12
|-
|1 + 3             || = 4  || = 22
|-
|1 + 3 + 5         || = 9  || = 32
|-
|1 + 3 + 5 + 7     || = 16 || = 42
|-
|1 + 3 + 5 + 7 + 9 || = 25 || = 52
|}

That the pattern continues forever can also be proven algebraically:

To clarify this proof, since the th odd positive integer is  if  denotes the sum of the first  odd integers then

so that  Substituting  and  gives, respectively, the formulas 
 

See also

Notes and references

External links

 Vsauce explains The Odd Number Rule

Classical mechanics
Kinematics